Faruk Quazi (January 17, 1949 - July 3, 2020) was a Bangladeshi journalist and law reporter. He served Bangladesh Prime Minister as Deputy Press Secretary and Bangladesh High Commission in New Delhi as Press Minister. He was also one of the founders and President of the Law Reporters' Forum of Bangladesh. He was a pioneer law reporter and introduced law reporting by journalists in Bangladesh. He covered the Supreme Court's proceedings since 1972. He covered parliament also.

After returning from Bangladesh Liberation War, 1971, Faruk Quazi joined now-defunct Daily Banglar Bani in 1972. In 1997 he joined Bangladesh Sangbad Songstha and then he was appointed as Deputy Press Secretary of Prime Minister and later on he joined Bangladesh High Commission in New Delhi as Press Minister.  Returning from New Delhi he joined UNB as Chief Correspondents of News and he established with his fellow friends Law Reporters' Forum and became the first President of the forum.

Early life and family 

Born in a respected family of Kushtia on Jan 17, 1949. His father Late Quazi Kafil Uddin Ahmed was a prominent lawyer of that time and Founder President of the Kushtia District Awami League. His father was elected MLA  in the 1954 election in East Bengal, the first election since Pakistan was created. His elder brother Quazi Rashidul Huq Pasha is a prominent journalist, writer, director, and actor of Bangladesh.

Student politics 

1968 movement in Pakistan took the form of a mass uprising of students and workers, attracting people from every profession. The uprising took place from early November 1968 to the end of March 1969, around 10 to 15 million people were involved. The movement resulted in the regime of Ayub Khan (President of Pakistan) being brought down. Faruk Quazi was a very active organizer of that student movement against Ayub Khan. His written posters were very popular at that time. He was arrested along with 10 more movement leaders and taken to jail. On the arrest of these 11 leaders, the protest became stronger in Kushtia.

Career

Started career as a Reporter in now-defunct “Banglar Bani”, a national daily, 1972.

Joined as a Senior Reporter at BSS in 1997 and was terminated in 2002 by the BNP Alliance Government.

Deputy Press Secretary-1 to Honorable Prime Minister Sheikh Hasina, 1999.

Minister (Press), Bangladesh High Commission in New Delhi  in 2000 and was terminated by the BNP Alliance Government in 2001

Served as a Chief of Correspondents at the UNB.

Establishing Law Reporters' Forum, 2004 

The BNP Alliance Government in 2001 came to power and the country was very unstable. The journalists found it very hard to report against the Government. To create a balance in journalism along with popular legal journalists of that time, Faruk Quazi and his team decided to form a forum and they named it Law Reporters' Forum. And he became the first President of the forum (2004-2009) and this is now a very successful organization and strong voice in the country.

Death 
Senior journalist Faruk Quazi died in his sleep at his flat on New Elephant Road in Dhaka on Friday morning. He was 71. His daughter Arshi Quazi said that her father was diagnosed with kidney failure on Thursday and he was kept sedated for pain. She said that after 58-hours of a deep sleep, 'my dad died at about 8:00 am on Friday,’. He was buried at Rayerbazar Intellectual Graveyard in Mohammadpur at 2:30 pm. Earlier, journalists, family members, and well-wishers paid their last respects to Faruk Quazi at his namaz-e-janaza held at the Kataban mosque after Jumma prayer.

He left behind his wife and a daughter.

References

External links 
 কোনরকম “আনডিউ প্রিভিলেজ” নেন নি
 প্রবীণ সাংবাদিক ফারুক কাজী আর নেই
 ‘ফারুক কাজী ছিলেন নির্ভীক সাংবাদিক’
 আজাহার আলী সরকার: ফারুক কাজী ভাইয়ের প্রতি আমার শ্রদ্ধা ও কৃতজ্ঞতা
 PM mourns death of veteran journalist Faruk Quazi
 BANGABANDHU MURDER CASE, covered by Faruk Quazi

Bangladeshi journalists
Newspaper reporters and correspondents
1949 births
2020 deaths